The European Social Charter is a Council of Europe treaty which was opened for signature on October 18, 1961 and initially became effective on February 26, 1965, after West Germany had become the fifth of the 13 signing nations to ratify it. By 1991, 20 nations had ratified it.

Contents
The Charter was established to support the European Convention on Human Rights which is principally for civil and political rights, and to broaden the scope of protected fundamental rights to include social and economic rights. The Charter also guarantees positive rights and freedoms which concern all individuals in their daily existence.  
The basic rights set out in the Charter are as follows: housing, health, education, labour rights, full employment, reduction of working hours equal pay for equal work, parental leave,  social security, social and legal protection from poverty and social exclusion, free movement of persons and non-discrimination, also the rights of migrant workers and that of the persons with disabilities.

States Parties to the Charter must submit annual reports on a part of the provisions of the Charter (be it the 1961 Charter or the 1996 Revised Charter), showing how they implement them in law and in practice.

1996 revision
The Charter was revised in 1996. The Revised Charter came into force in 1999 and is gradually replacing the initial 1961 treaty.  The Charter sets out human rights and freedoms and establishes a supervisory mechanism guaranteeing their respect by the States parties.

Article 21 creates the right to information and consultation.

Article 22 creates the "right to take part in the determination and improvement of the working conditions and working environment", or codetermination through representation on company or enterprise board of directors and work councils.

European Committee of Social Rights
The European Committee of Social Rights (ECSR) is the body responsible for monitoring compliance in the States party to the Charter.

The ECSR is composed of 15 independent members who are elected by the Council of Europe's Committee of Ministers for a period of six years, renewable once.

Under the 1995 Additional Protocol providing for a system of Collective Complaints which came into force in 1998, complaints of violations of the Charter may be lodged with the ECSR.

Certain organisations are entitled to lodge complaints with the ECSR (a special list of NGOs has been established, made up of NGOs enjoying participatory status with the Council of Europe). The ECSR examines the complaint and, if the formal requirements have been met, declares it admissible. The State Party may then respond in writing, and a hearing may be requested by either party to the procedure. Finally, the Committee comes to a decision on the merits.

See also 
 European Convention on Human Rights
 European Convention for the Prevention of Torture and Inhuman or Degrading Treatment or Punishment
 European decency threshold
 EU labour law
 Charter of Fundamental Rights of the European Union
 Economic, social and cultural rights
 International human rights law
 Three generations of human rights
 List of Council of Europe treaties

Notes

External links 
European Social Charter website
 1961 European Social Charter
Revised European Social Charter
1995 Additional Protocol providing for a system of Collective Complaints
Concise overview of the European Social Charter

Social Charter
Human rights instruments
Treaties entered into force in 1961
Treaties concluded in 1996
Treaties entered into force in 1999
Treaties entered into force in 1965
1961 in Italy
Treaties of Austria
Treaties of Belgium
Treaties of Croatia
Treaties of Cyprus
Treaties of the Czech Republic
Treaties of Denmark
Treaties of Finland
Treaties of France
Treaties of West Germany
Treaties of Greece
Treaties of Hungary
Treaties of Iceland
Treaties of Ireland
Treaties of Italy
Treaties of Latvia
Treaties of Luxembourg
Treaties of Malta
Treaties of the Netherlands
Treaties of Norway
Treaties of Poland
Treaties of Portugal
Treaties of Slovakia
Treaties of Spain
Treaties of Sweden
Treaties of North Macedonia
Treaties of Turkey
Treaties of the United Kingdom
Treaties extended to the Netherlands Antilles
Treaties extended to Aruba
Treaties extended to the Isle of Man